Kerala Varma Thampuran (1870 – July 1948) popularly known as Aikya Keralam Thampuran or Kerala Varma VII was the Maharaja (king) of Cochin who ruled between 1946 and 1949. He mooted the idea of a unified Kerala state in India for the Malayalam speaking population and stood for the merging of British Malabar, Cochin and Travancore. Therefore, he was given the sobriquet Ikyakeralam Thampuran (King who united Kerala). He died in July 1948 (1123 Midhunam 25th according to the Malayalam calendar). He was also the brain behind the formation of Sree Kerala Varma College at Thrissur, named after him.

Biography
Born in 1870, he ruled the Kingdom of Cochin from 1946.

Kerala Varma, the Maharaja of Cochin, played a pivotal role in the unification of Kerala and the accession of the Kingdom of Cochin to the Indian Union. In April 1947, he inaugurated the Aikya Kerala Convention held in Thrissur  under  the chairmanship of K. Kelappan. The convention passed a resolution for the formation of a 'United Kerala'. He was later known as the 'Aikya Keralam Thampuran' for his stand for the amalgamation of Malabar District, Cochin and Travancore to form a unified Kerala state.

He died in July 1948.

References

The Hindu "New role for Kalikota palace", 21 August 2010.
The Hindu "Due recognition sought for kochi royal family", 22 August 2010.
 Express News Service Royal memories of dawn of freedom, 22 August 2010

1948 deaths
Rulers of Cochin
1870 births